is a railway station in Nishiyodogawa-ku, Osaka, Osaka Prefecture, Japan.

Lines
Hanshin Electric Railway
Hanshin Namba Line

Layout

Adjacent stations

|-
!colspan=5|Hanshin Railway

All rapid express trains pass Chidoribashi, Dempo, Fuku, Dekijima, and Daimotsu every day from March 20, 2012, and suburban semi-express trains run to Amagasaki instead.

References 

Railway stations in Osaka Prefecture
Stations of Hanshin Electric Railway
Railway stations in Japan opened in 1924